"In the Kitchen" is a song by R. Kelly, released domestically in 2005 as a double A-side single together with "Trapped in the Closet (Chapter 1)". Both songs are from the studio album TP.3 Reloaded. It also served internationally as the B-side to "Playa's Only" featuring The Game.

Charts

Weekly charts

References

2005 songs
2005 singles
R. Kelly songs
Songs written by R. Kelly
Song recordings produced by R. Kelly
Trapped in the Closet
Jive Records singles